The laia is a two-pronged type of foot-plough used in the Basque Country. Aside from being a farming implement, it is also used in laia racing. The people using a laia are referred to as laiariak in Basque.

Etymology

The word is also attested as lai, without the absolutive ending but is mainly used in the form of laia today. Other forms include lain (Oiartzun) and laixa (Eibar). Beyond that the etymology is not entirely clear, but a connection with names for other forked implements in other neighbouring Romance languages such as the Béarnese word layà (a forked instrument for gathering chestnuts) seems plausible.

See also
Foot plough
Loy

References

External links
Laya race in Artaxao

Farming tools
Basque culture